Pavel Viktorovich Ryaboshapka (born 25 November 1983) is a former Russian professional football player.

Club career
He played 5 seasons in the Russian Football National League for FC Neftekhimik Nizhnekamsk and FC SKA-Energiya Khabarovsk.

References

External links
 

1983 births
Living people
Russian footballers
Association football defenders
FC Neftekhimik Nizhnekamsk players
FC SKA-Khabarovsk players